Kamalvand may refer to:

Arash Kamalvand (born 1989), Iranian volleyball player
Faraz Kamalvand (born 1977), Iranian football coach
Kamalvand, Hamadan, a village in Hamadan Province, Iran
Kamalvand, Khuzestan, a village in Khuzestan Province, Iran
Chaleh-ye Kamalvand, a village in Lorestan Province, Iran
Kamalvand-e Gholam Ali, a village in Lorestan Province, Iran
Kamalvand-e Iman Ali, a village in Lorestan Province, Iran
Kamalvand-e Mohammad Hoseyn Parvaneh, a village in Lorestan Province, Iran